[[File:Blake A Divine Image.jpg|thumb|Scan of "A Divine Image]]

"A Divine Image" is a poem by William Blake from Songs of Experience, not to be confused with "The Divine Image" from Songs of Innocence. The poem only appeared in copy BB of the combined Songs of Innocence and of Experience. 

Ralph Vaughan Williams set the poem to music in his 1958 song cycle Ten Blake Songs'', under the title "Cruelty Has a Human Heart".

Full text

References

Songs of Innocence and of Experience